Yordan Todorov (Bulgarian: Йордан Тодоров; born 1 January 1999) is a Bulgarian footballer who plays as a winger. He is currently played for FC Slivnishki Geroy (Slivnitsa).

Career

Septemvri Sofia
In the summer of 2017 Yordan Todorov was promoted to the first team of Septemvri Sofia. He made his professional debut for the team on 12 October 2017 in league match against Botev Plovdiv.

Career statistics

Club

References

External links
 

1999 births
Living people
Bulgarian footballers
Bulgaria youth international footballers
Association football midfielders
FC Septemvri Sofia players
FC Lokomotiv 1929 Sofia players
PFC Rilski Sportist Samokov players
FC Hebar Pazardzhik players
First Professional Football League (Bulgaria) players